Randal Plunkett, 21st Baron of Dunsany (born 9 March 1983), is an Irish film director, producer and editor, as well as a landowner and holder of one of the oldest surviving Irish peerage titles, and one of the longest-inhabited houses in Ireland, Dunsany Castle, and its remaining estate.

Plunkett succeeded to the Dunsany title upon the death of his father in 2011. As of 2022, he is engaged to marry, and his properties and title have living heirs.

In his professional life, he has directed a range of film shorts, worked on several dozen other film projects, and provided location and post-production services from his demesne. He produced his first feature film, The Green Sea in 2018–2019 and released it in 2021.

Plunkett became an advocate for rewilding in 2014 and has dedicated over a third of the ancestral estate in County Meath as Ireland's largest private nature reserve. First successes of the project include the return of the corncrake, several species of birds of prey, including the Red-listed red kite, the rare Great Spotted Woodpecker and other birds, as well as multiple other animal species, including pine marten, stoat and the Red-listed otter. A number of rescued wildlife are also being re-released after rehabilitation by local wildlife rescues. He has made appearances in Irish and international media, promoting the rewilding cause.

Early life
Plunkett was born on 8 March 1983 in New York City, where his parents were living at the time operating an architectural and design studio. He is the elder of the two children (both sons) of the 20th Baron of Dunsany, the painter, sculptor and designer Eddie Plunkett, and his Brazilian wife, architect Maria Alice de Marsillac Plunkett (née Villela de Carvalho). Aside from his younger brother, he has a step-sister Joana and a step-brother Daniel, both older, and the four children grew up together. On the paternal side, he is the great-grandson of the 18th Baron of Dunsany, the playwright and author of fantasy stories and novels usually known as Lord Dunsany, and grandson of his half-Brazilian namesake, British Indian Army Lieutenant Colonel Randal Plunkett. He is descended from the Earls of Jersey, and the family of explorer Sir Richard Francis Burton. On the maternal side, his family traces its origins through centuries of Brazilian history, to key figures from the founding days of Brazil as a Portuguese territory, Vasco da Gama and Pedro Álvares Cabral. His grandfather was a colonel turned architect. He also has two aunts and an uncle.

The Plunkett family subsequently moved, first to London, where Eddie Plunkett had a studio in 1993, and then, in 1994, to the Plunkett homeland in Ireland, going to live at Dunsany Castle, where the then Lord Dunsany was living with his second wife. For primary school, Randal Plunkett attended a local school and the private Headfort School outside Kells, then took his Junior Certificate at The King's Hospital on the outskirts of Dublin. He pursued senior secondary studies at Institut Le Rosey, a boarding school in Rolle and Gstaad, Switzerland, and at a pre-college centre in Oxford, where he studied the classics, English literature and sociology. He credited some of his inspiration around film to one of his teachers there, Louise Longson, and has said that, in discussion with her, he moved his focus from sociology to film and scriptwriting, interests since childhood, when his father introduced him to the work of, for example, Luis Buñuel at the age of 6 and Ingrid Bergman at 7, and paid pocket money for short stories and illustrations.

Plunkett lived for some years in central London and studied for a degree in Film Studies at Kingston University in southern London. He returned to Ireland after graduation, to help care for his father, who was suffering from a long-term neurological illness, and during this period he worked on a potential career in sports science, considering opening a gym, or working as a personal trainer. Encouraged by his parents, he later returned to the idea of working in film, and pursued an intensive course in Digital Video with an emphasis on practical skills, at the SAE Institute, from the Amsterdam campus of which he graduated with a diploma. He later studied further at the SAE branch in London, where he met a future collaborator, cinematographer Stefano Battarola.

Peerage succession
Plunkett succeeded to the title of Baron of Dunsany on 24 May 2011, upon the death of his father. While the estate was reduced in size under the Irish Land Acts, with much farmland transferred to tenants, it remains a substantial landholding, between Dunshaughlin and the Hill of Tara. The current heir to his title is his younger brother, Oliver, a games designer and programmer who lives in the US.

Career
Plunkett began his filmmaking career around 2009, producing and directing a range of short films, which have been shown at various film festivals. His directorial debut was the dark-toned thriller Kiss Kiss (2010), set in London, and shown at the Leicester Square Odeon. He then returned to Ireland, producing Guerrilla, directed by Blaine Rennicks and starring Jack Lowe and Darren Killeen, on the Dunsany lands from winter 2009. The low-budget film, with a crew of 40, was based on a concept of Ireland under martial law after social collapse in Europe in 2013, and was released in 2010. It won the "Best Production" award at the Naas Film Festival.  This was followed by the "grindhouse horror"-style Prey (2011).  Plunkett's 4th short film, written with some autobiographical elements, was Walt (2011), which won the Best Drama Award at the LIT Festival. Plunkett has used his estate lands and buildings, some partly ruinous, as locations for much of his filming after Guerrilla, including for Prey and Walt.

Plunkett's cited influences include Philip K. Dick and directors Roman Polanski, David Lynch and Peter Greenaway, and influential films include Hitchcock's The Crows and both Andrei Tarkovsky's and Steven Soderbergh's productions of Solaris. He has mentioned that while he would not be a deep fan of his great-grandfather's work, he would see some parallels of interests between his film work and the 18th Lord Dunsany's imaginative writings.

Out There and production work
Plunkett secured external private funding for his next film, a post-apocalyptic horror movie Out There, co-writing the script with his brother Oliver. The short film, released in 2012, starred Conor Marren as Robert and Emma Eliza Regan as Jane, with Cian Lavelle-Walsh, Aaron Lee Read and Emmet Kelly. Filmed at Dunsany, the cinematographer was Stefano Battarola, the composer was Darius McGann and Plunkett was the lead editor. Out There was awarded Best Industry Short at the Limerick Film Festival as well as Best Short Movie at a festival in Germany. Subsequently, it was selected to play Cannes Film Festival.

In 2010, Plunkett established Dunsany Productions, a film production company, at Dunsany Castle. He worked on more than 40 film projects in Ireland, in various production roles, and in post-production at his facilities at Dunsany, while looking to produce longer work of his own.

The Green Sea
Plunkett's first feature-length film, the drama The Green Sea, was filmed in Mullingar, County Westmeath, Dublin, at Brittas Bay in County Wicklow, and at Dunsany, where one lodge was painted black for the production; about half the scenes were from Mullingar.  It was filmed and produced 2018–2019 but only released, after Covid-related delays, mid-2021. Plunkett was director, scriptwriter and executive producer, with Canadian actress Katharine Isabelle, Helen Doupe and Dermot Ward in the principal roles, as Simone, "the kid" and Justin respectively. Further roles were played by Amy-Joyce Hastings, Jenny Dixon, Ciaron Davies, and a dozen others.  The cinematographer was Philipp Morozov, while the composer was Darius McGann. Stephen Lourdes was producer and Helen Serruya line producer. Plunkett performed the editing himself, alongside Chris Gill.

Plunkett has described the film as having semi-autobiographical influences. The Green Sea was picked up by Reel-to-Reel and released as both video-on-demand and streaming material, including on Amazon's Prime Video platform. As of July 2022, it is distributed to rent or buy on a range of platforms. Critical reception included a review in The Guardian, which commented that "it sorta-kinda works, bolstered by the leads’ rapport, and cinematographer Philipp Morozov’s big-picture exteriors". Of Plunkett himself, the Guardian critic comments that the film "suggests Plunkett has spent his leisure time in the library with many of the right ghost stories" while "his debut, the embodiment of a flawed-but-intriguing mixed bag, offers a fair bit to build on." Reviewer Josh at the Movies commented that "The Green Sea is a vibrant movie filled with personality. [...] This Irish indie is an unexpected gem one will not want to miss." Junsui Films remarked that it was "Infused with a natural tinge of mystery and a stark, rippling undercurrent of suspense Randal Plunkett's dark and compelling drama The Green Sea unfurls a strikingly assured cinematic puzzle that deftly dissolves the line between fantasy and reality with haunting effect", Horror Cult Films observed "A thoughtful, rollercoaster of emotion, THE GREEN SEA is a dark yet beautiful journey that explores humanity’s flourishes and flaws in all their naked glory.", and Warped Perspective found that "The Green Sea can be unsettling, with some fantastical elements, but ultimately it’s a very beautiful, humane and redemptive film.". The Spooky Isles suggested that "if you fancy the idea of losing yourself in a superbly performed, beautifully shot, fantasy-tinged mystery-drama for 104 minutes, then you’ve come to the right place", and The Film Authority concluded that The Green Sea is "...rewarding for audiences prepared to take a detour from the beaten path...". Further reviews include Upcoming on Screen, who found The Green Sea to be a "slow-burn drama that doesn’t take you down the road well-travelled – an intimate film that stays with you", Absolute Badasses who judged it to be "A SLOW BURNING GEM ★★★★", The Perplexed Translator who found the film to be "intriguing, thoughtful and carefully crafted", and The Music City Drive-In who concluded that "Randal Plunkett is remarkable at writing this blend of mystery and fantasy that keeps you guessing on what is real or not. I loved his unique approach to the film and was genuinely blown away that he could write something raw and personal within this world.".

Plunkett's work and the film itself were awarded as Best Feature Film at the Paris Play Film Festival, April 2021, Best Indie Feature Film and Best Feature Script at the Florence Film Awards, April 2021, and Best Production and Best Editing at the New York Movie Awards, April 2021.

Rewilding
Plunkett is a practitioner of and advocate for rewilding. He became a vegan in 2014, adhering to a strict dietary code and also not wearing leather clothing or shoes. Around the same time, he came across the then-novel concept of rewilding land. Having initially moved Dunsany to organic farming, and discontinued chemical pesticide usage, he subsequently designated  of the Dunsany Estate (of at least 1,500 acres) as a nature preserve, with several hundred acres of forestry, and with farming on the remaining land – rented to local people – limited to crops such as wheat, rapeseed and beans only. He has also ceased cutting the decorative lawns around Dunsany Castle, in particular aiming to create a wildlife meadow in front of the building. He has spoken of an at-times negative reaction among some local people to the change of use for prime farming land, decried as wasteful. Dunsany Nature Reserve is Ireland's largest privately-owned nature reserve, and as of 2022 is the only Irish rewilding project recognised by the European Rewilding Network. Plunkett has also banned hunting, whether on horseback or on foot, on his lands, which he has said resulted in threats, but does not plan to remove heritage items with hunting connections from the castle. He has described persistent attempts to break into the lands by trespassing hunters and poachers and he has a patrol routine, and has also support from volunteers and a camera setup. Small groups are allowed a visit by arrangement but Plunkett has said he does not plan structured paths and signage, or visitor attraction facilities such as a café. He has worked with a local hotel in the nearest village, Kilmessan, to facilitate guests who would like to visit the estate, with an option to sponsor tree-planting. The rewilding project receives no external funding, State or private, although around 14,000 euro was allocated in 2020 by the Department of Tourism, Culture, Arts, Gaeltacht, Sport and Media for urgent works on the castle and walled garden, on which he and his family and staff have been working.  The potential revival of a former railway line which used to pass through the estate near the River Skane has been noted as a concern.

Plunkett has noted the first appearance of the Great Spotted Woodpecker in County Meath, confirmed by Niall Hatch of BirdWatch Ireland, and the return of corncrakes, barn owls and red kites, as well as peregrine falcons, herons, buzzards, kestrels and sparrowhawks, to his lands since his rewilding project began. Stoats and endangered pine martens have also moved in, while otters have been seen around the small river on the lands, and even red squirrels have been sighted. These join rabbits, hares, deer, bats and other established animal types. Plunkett has also announced plans for reforestation with long-living native Irish tree species, and the estate has seen a growth in diversity of flora, going from three varieties of grass to 23. He is also working with local wildlife rescues, rehabilitating and rehoming rescued wildlife, including hedgehogs, foxes and badgers, having allowed the rescues to set up dedicated facilities for these animals, as well as accepting rescue birds. A facility for rescued otters has been set up on the estate's former tennis court. Plunkett is also collaborating with the Irish Bee Conservation Project, who have set up a number of bee lodges for solitary bees as well as native Irish black bees. Botanists from Trinity College Dublin are studying the ecological impact of the rewilding project and have observed significant numbers of butterflies.

Plunkett was nominated for the Farming for Nature Awards in 2021, with a citation for the commitment to, and success to date of, the project, and in 2021 a calendar featuring scenes from the rewilded estate was produced for sale by photographer Daniel Fildes, featuring both returned species such as red kites and buzzards, as well as pheasants, foxes and deer, and both kingfishers and their prey, fish, in the once-polluted River Skane.

Media and social media
In 2013, Plunkett appeared in the final episode of the second season of TLC's reality television series Secret Princes, in which his brother Oliver was appearing as a series regular.

Since 2019, Plunkett and his Dunsany Nature Reserve have been portrayed on radio, TV and in print and news agency reports local and international. TV and news agency features include Euronews, AFP, and the German Deutsche Welle, as well as Ireland's RTÉ One show Nationwide. Articles have been published in print media including The Guardian, Vice (magazine), Eluxe and The Irish Times. Plunkett has also participated in radio interviews, such as with the local LMFM and national stations Today FM and RTÉ Radio.

He has active online presences on Facebook, Twitter and Instagram, where he routinely posts images from Dunsany Nature Reserve and information about his film work.

Personal life
Randal Plunkett's father died in 2011 after a long illness, and was buried by the Church of St Nicholas on the estate, and the estate was run thereafter by Plunkett with support from his mother.  Maria Alice Plunkett died in the early stages of the Covid-19 pandemic, in 2020, and her son and a local priest held a private funeral for her, due to Covid-related restrictions; she is buried beside her husband.

Having previously been in a relationship with Irish actress Emma Eliza Regan, Plunkett met his partner, occupational therapist Laura Dillon, in Mullingar. He visited her in the town and with much of his film, The Green Sea filmed there, she appeared in it with her mother in one scene. Plunkett and Dillon announced their engagement formally in November 2020. The heir to the castle and estate is their daughter. Plunkett has stated that his child will inherit the property, while as of 2022 the title would still pass elsewhere, due to what he has described as medieval provisions reserving inheritance of most titles to males, but he has expressed hope this situation may be changed.

Like his father, the 21st Lord Dunsany — closest living relative of Catholic archbishop, martyr and saint Oliver Plunkett — and his mother, Plunkett adheres to the Roman Catholic faith, and he has stated, in an interview with the UK's Catholic newspaper, The Tablet, that his daughter will be baptised, probably in Dunsany's 15th-century carved baptismal font. Plunkett works with others on the literary heritage of his great-grandfather.

Descent

Notes

Sources

 Dunsany Productions website

1983 births
Living people
Barons of Dunsany
Ernle family
Drax family
Irish people of Brazilian descent
People from New York City
20th-century Irish people
People from County Meath
21st-century Irish people
Irish film directors
Irish film producers
Rewilding advocates
Alumni of Institut Le Rosey